The Alutiiq language (also called Sugpiak, Sugpiaq, Sugcestun, Suk, Supik, Pacific Gulf Yupik, Gulf Yupik, Koniag-Chugach) is a close relative to the Central Alaskan Yup'ik language spoken in the western and southwestern Alaska, but is considered a distinct language. It has two major dialects:
 Koniag Alutiiq: spoken on the upper part of the Alaska Peninsula and on Kodiak Island; it was also spoken on  Afognak Island before that was deserted by the people in the wake of the 1964 Good Friday earthquake.
 Chugach Alutiiq: spoken on the Kenai Peninsula and in Prince William Sound.

The ethnonyms of the Sugpiaq-Alutiiq are a predicament. Aleut, Alutiiq, Sugpiaq, Russian, Pacific Eskimo, Unegkuhmiut, and Chugach Eskimo are among the terms that have been used to identify this group of Native people living on the Lower Kenai Peninsula of Alaska.

About 400 of the Alutiiq population of 3,000 still speak the Alutiiq language. Alutiiq communities are currently in the process of revitalizing their language.  In 2010 the high school in Kodiak responded to requests from students and agreed to teach the Alutiiq language. The Kodiak dialect of the language was spoken by only about 50 persons, all of them elderly, and the dialect was in danger of being lost entirely. As of 2014, Alaska Pacific University in Anchorage is offering classes using the "Where Are Your Keys?" technique.

Phonology

Consonants 

Consonants may be double and have geminated sounds (e.g. kk; [kː]). More consonants /ɾ~r, lʲ, rʲ/  can only be found in loanwords.

Vowels 

All vowels except for /ə/, are considered as full vowels, distinguished with vowel length. /ə/ does not lengthen, nor occurs into vowel clusters, but may tend to be devoiced as /ə̥/ next to other consonants.

Orthography 
 a - [ä]
 c - [t͡ʃ]
 e - [ə]
 f - [f]
 g - [x]
 gw - [xʷ]
 hm - [m̥]
 hn - [n̥]
 hng - [ŋ̊]
 i - [i]
 k - [k]
 kw - [kʷ]
 l - [l]
 ll - [ɬ]
 m - [m]
 n - [n]
 ng - [ŋ]
 p - [p]
 q - [q]
 r - [χ]
 ʀ - [r]
 s - [s]
 t - [t]
 u - [u]
 w - [w]
 y - [j]

After voiceless consonants, the voiceless nasals are written without h-.

Other letters 
 aa - [aː]
 ai - [ai]
 au - [au]
 ia - [ia]
 ii - [iː]
 iu - [iu]
 ua - [ua]
 ui - [ui]
 uu - [uː]

Vocabulary comparison 
The comparison of number terms and month names in the two dialects:

References

Further reading

 Bass, Willard P., Edward A. Tennant, and Carl Anahonak. Test of Oral Language Dominance Sugpiaq Aleut-English. Albuquerque, N.M.: Southwest Research Association, 1973.
 Counceller, April Gale Laktonen, Jeff Leer, and Nick Alokli. Kodiak Alutiiq Conversational Phrasebook With Audio CD. Kodiak, Alaska: Alutiiq Museum & Archaeological Repository, 2006.
 Leer, Jeff, Carl Anahonak, Arthur Moonin, and Derenty Tabios. Nanwalegmiut paluwigmiut-llu nupugnerit = Conversational Alutiiq dictionary : Kenai Peninsula Alutiiq. Fairbanks, AK: Alaska Native Language Center, University of Alaska Fairbanks, 2003.
 Leer, Jeff, and Nina Zeedar. Classroom Grammar of Koniag Alutiiq, Kodiak Island Dialect. Fairbanks, AK: Alaska Native Language Center, University of Alaska Fairbanks, 1990.
  Leer, Jeff, Matrona Christiansen, Doris Lind, Thomas Phillips, Ralph Phillips (1996). A Short Dictionary of Alaska Peninsula Sugtestun & Alaska Peninsula Alutiiq Workbook. Fairbanks, AK: Alaska Native Language Center, University of Alaska Fairbanks. 
 Pratt Museum (Homer, Alaska). Qulianguat Kiputʹsluki = Bringing the Stories Back : Alutiiq Sugpiaq Remembrances of the Outer Coast of Kenai Peninsula, Alaska. Homer, Alaska: Pratt Museum, 2003.
 Russell, Priscilla N. English Bay and Port Graham Alutiiq Plantlore. Homer, Alaska: Pratt Museum, Homer Society of Natural History, 1991.
 Steffian, Amy F., and Florence Pestrikof. Alutiiq Word of the Week. Kodiak, AK: Alutiiq Museum & Archaeological Repository, 1999. 

 John E. Smelcer, Alutiiq Noun Dictionary, 2010

External links
 alutiiqmuseum.org Alutiiq Word of the Week
 alutiiqlanguage.org Learn the Alutiiq Language
 uaf.edu Alaska Native Languages - Alutiiq
 asna.ca Alutiiq Orthodox language texts

Alutiiq
Agglutinative languages
Indigenous languages of Alaska
Yupik languages
Endangered Eskaleut languages
Official languages of Alaska